Alsophila christii may refer to:
Alsophila christii Sodiro, accepted name Lophosoria quadripinnata (J.F.Gmel.) C.Chr.
Alsophila christii Alderw., accepted name Sphaeropteris elmeri (Copel.) R.M.Tryon